The American daily newspaper The New York Times publishes multiple weekly list ranking the best selling books in the United States. The lists are split in three genres—fiction, nonfiction and children's books. Both the fiction and nonfiction lists are further split into multiple lists.

Fiction
The following list ranks the best selling fiction books, in the combined print and e-books category. For the second consecutive year, the most frequent weekly best seller of the year was Where the Crawdads Sing by Delia Owens with 7 weeks at the top of the list.

Nonfiction
The following list ranks the best selling nonfiction books, in the combined print and e-books category.

See also
 Publishers Weekly list of bestselling novels in the United States in the 2020s

References

2020
.
New York Times best sellers
New York Times best sellers
New York Times best sellers